Arcabuco was the name of a footpath starting in Old Havana, in the vicinity of the church of Loma del Ángel, and ran in a westerly direction to an inlet cove of approximately  wide and  in depth. When Juan Guillén a Spanish soldier installed a carpentry shop to build small boats close to the cove the site became known as “La Caleta de Juan Guillén”, the road was known as “the caleta”. Eventually the Hospital de San Lázaro, the Espada Cemetery, the San Dionisio mental asylum, and La Casa de Beneficencia were developed in close proximity to the Caleta de San Lazaro.

Dredging the Caleta of San Lazaro 

In 1916 the dredging of the Caleta of San Lazaro began, in September the 1919 Florida Keys hurricane hit Havana and the rise in sea level raised the inland stretch that had been artificially created, the flood almost reached the Casa de la Beneficencia. In 1921, dredging was resumed and the construction of the Malecón wall began from the Torreón de San Lázaro to the current 23rd Street, the section was completed in 1923.

See also

 Barrio de San Lázaro, Havana
 Espada Cemetery
 La Casa de Beneficencia y Maternidad de La Habana
 Hospital de San Lázaro, Havana
 Malecón, Havana
 Havana Plan Piloto
 Timeline of Havana
 Laws of the Indies
 Cartography of Latin America

References

External links
 Construcción para la Ciudad de La Habana
 Calle Belascoain
 BELASCOAIN - (vídeo musical)
 CALLE SAN LAZARO CENTRO HABANA
 Ruinas de la calle San Lázaro, Ctro.Habana. Ruins of San Lázaro Street.
 SAN LÁZARO 🇨🇺 LA CALLE MÁS DESTRUIDA DE LA HABANA
 La Casa de Beneficencia de la Habana.
 JAI ALAI - HABANA ‘El Palacio de los Gritos’
 Eusebio Leal on Cuba Arte
 Eusebio Leal on Havana Cultural Patrimony

Buildings and structures in Havana
Streets in Havana
History of Havana